Noureddine Bousnina (born 17 January 1963) is a Tunisian footballer. He competed in the men's tournament at the 1988 Summer Olympics. He later became a manager.

References

1963 births
Living people
Tunisian footballers
Tunisia international footballers
CS Hammam-Lif players
Olympic footballers of Tunisia
Footballers at the 1988 Summer Olympics
Place of birth missing (living people)
Association football midfielders
Tunisian football managers
CS Hammam-Lif managers
Tunisian Ligue Professionnelle 1 managers
Tunisian expatriate football managers
Expatriate football managers in Libya
Tunisian expatriate sportspeople in Libya